The Hollywood Knickerbocker Apartments, formerly the Hollywood Knickerbocker Hotel, is a historic former hotel, now a retirement home, located at 1714 Ivar Avenue in Los Angeles, California.

History

Designed in 1923 by architect E.M. Frasier in the Spanish Colonial Revival style, the building was built as the Security Apartments, but never opened. It was finally completed in 1929 and rechristened the Hollywood Knickerbocker Hotel in June 1929.

The hotel catered to the region's nascent film industry, and is the site for some of Hollywood’s most famous dramatic moments.  On Halloween 1936, Harry Houdini's widow held her tenth séance to contact the magician on the roof of the hotel. On January 13, 1943, Frances Farmer was arrested in her room at the hotel after failing to visit her probation officer when scheduled. According to the Los Angeles Times on July 23, 1948, filmmaker D. W. Griffith died of a cerebral hemorrhage on the way to a Hollywood hospital, after being discovered unconscious in the lobby of the hotel. However, Griffith may not have collapsed in the lobby at all. Numerous newspapers reported that Griffith had been "stricken inside his hotel room" instead. Contrary to popular belief, Rudolf Valentino was not a regular at the bar, as the hotel opened after his death in 1926.

The hotel retained its glamor through the 1950s. Marilyn Monroe and Joe DiMaggio often met in the hotel bar. On December 1, 1954, a camera crew from the NBC program This Is Your Life surprised retired comedy legends Stan Laurel and Oliver Hardy in room 205 of the hotel. The duo was relaxing there with a couple of friends who were in on the gag. While both comedians were polite throughout the show, Stan Laurel was apparently privately somewhat displeased to be put on television without his consent or prior notice. Elvis Presley stayed at the hotel (Room 1016) while making his first film, Love Me Tender (1956). In 1962, celebrated Hollywood costume designer Irene Lentz, committed suicide by jumping from her 11th-floor room window. While she left a suicide note behind, her business manager told the press "Irene had been under a terrific strain. She had been in ill health for about two years, and because of ill health, she did what she did."

On March 3, 1966, veteran character actor William Frawley was strolling down Hollywood Boulevard after seeing a film when he suffered a major heart attack. According to The 'I Love Lucy' Book: Including a Revised, Expanded, and Updated Version of Lucy & Ricky & Fred & Ethel,   author Bart Andrews briefly states that after Frawley had collapsed on Hollywood Blvd., a male nurse had dragged him to the hotel where he died in the lobby. However, this may be apocryphal because there are no newspapers from 1966 that mention Frawley ever being taken to the Hollywood Knickerbocker, which was located half a block up a hill from where Frawley had collapsed. According to the Los Angeles Times, Frawley died in the street.   Contrary to popular belief, Frawley did not live in the hotel at the time. Although Frawley had spent nearly 30 years living in a suite upstairs, he had moved to the nearby El Royale Apartments several months before.

In 1968, Graham Nash was staying there the day Cass Elliot picked him up to go meet Stephen Stills and David Crosby.

By the late 1960s, the neighborhood had deteriorated, and the hotel became a residence primarily for drug addicts and prostitutes. In 1970, a renovation project converted the hotel into housing for senior citizens. In 1999, a plaque honoring Griffith was placed in the lobby.

Filming 
The building's central-Hollywood location resulted in it appearing in numerous productions, either directly or indirectly. For example, in the 1936 film The Reckless Way, it was the hotel in which Marian Nixon's character worked. In the 1950 film 711 Ocean Drive with Edmond O'Brien, it was the backdrop of a syndicate meeting. The hotel and its surrounding street also served as the backdrop for the opening scene of a first-season episode of the 1966 series Mission Impossible, titled "Operation Rogosh" (Season 1, Episode 3).

Between 1964 and 1970, viewers of the ABC variety series The Hollywood Palace would regularly see the hotel building and its neon sign in the background of performances videotaped in the Hollywood Palace's parking lot, directly behind the hotel.

The sign over the front entrance identifying it as a hotel was still in place when the TV series Mannix filmed a scene there for the 1970 episode, "Only One Death to a Customer" (Season 3, Episode 20).

References

External links 
Official website
Photo of The Knickerbocker Hotel at you-are-here.com

Defunct organizations based in Hollywood, Los Angeles
Hotels in Los Angeles
Landmarks in Los Angeles
Buildings and structures in Hollywood, Los Angeles
Hotels established in 1929
Hotel buildings completed in 1929
Defunct hotels in Los Angeles